Epix Pharmaceuticals Inc (formerly Predix Pharmaceuticals Inc) was a pharmaceutical company based in Lexington, Massachusetts.

Its products included the following agents:

 PRX-00023—5-HT1A receptor full agonist (later discovered to be an antagonist): for major depression and generalized anxiety disorder
 PRX-03140—5-HT4 receptor partial agonist: for Alzheimer's disease
 PRX-07034—5-HT6 receptor antagonist: for obesity and cognitive impairment associated with Alzheimer's disease and schizophrenia
 PRX-08066—5-HT2B receptor antagonist: for pulmonary hypertension associated with chronic obstructive pulmonary disease

As of July 2009, the company was in the process of asset liquidation due to insufficient funds to stay afloat.

References

External links 
 EPIX Pharmaceuticals, Inc. web site

Defunct pharmaceutical companies of the United States
Companies based in Lexington, Massachusetts
Health care companies based in Massachusetts
Defunct companies based in Massachusetts
Companies formerly listed on the Nasdaq
Pharmaceutical companies disestablished in 2009